John Rogers Commons (October 13, 1862 – May 11, 1945) was an American institutional economist, Georgist, progressive and labor historian at the University of Wisconsin–Madison.

Early years
John R. Commons was born in Hollansburg, Ohio on October 13, 1862. Commons had a religious upbringing which led him to be an advocate for social justice early in life. Commons was considered a poor student and suffered from a mental illness while studying. He was allowed to graduate without finishing because of the potential seen in his intense determination and curiosity. At this time, Commons became a follower of Henry George's 'single tax' economics. He carried this 'Georgist' or 'Ricardian' approach to economics, with a focus on land and monopoly rents, throughout the rest of his life, including a proposal for income taxes with higher rates on land rents.

After graduating from Oberlin College, Commons did two years of graduate studies at Johns Hopkins University, where he studied under Richard T. Ely, but left without a degree. After appointments at Oberlin and Indiana University, Commons began teaching at Syracuse University in 1895.

In spring 1899, Syracuse dismissed him as a radical. Eventually Commons  re-entered academia at the University of Wisconsin in 1904.

Commons' early work exemplified his desire to unite Christian ideals with the emerging social sciences of sociology and economics. He was a frequent contributor to Kingdom magazine, was a founder of the American Institute for Christian Sociology, and authored a book in 1894 called Social Reform and the Church. He was an advocate of temperance legislation and was active in the national Prohibition Party. By his Wisconsin years, Commons' scholarship had become less moralistic and more empirical, and he moved away from a religious viewpoint in his ethics and sociology.

Career

Commons is best known for developing an analysis of collective action by the state and other institutions, which he saw as essential to understanding economics. Commons believed that carefully crafted legislation could create social change; that view led him to be known as a socialist radical and incrementalist. Contrary to some published accounts, Commons did consider African Americans capable of voting. When he advocated proportional representation, he suggested a "negro party". He even suggested  applying the Thirteenth amendment to the Constitution to force Southern States to allow African Americans to vote. He continued the strong American tradition in institutional economics by such figures as the economist and social theorist Thorstein Veblen. His notion of transaction is one of the most important contributions to Institutional Economics. The institutional theory was closely related to his remarkable successes in fact-finding and drafting legislation on a wide range of social issues for the state of Wisconsin. He drafted legislation establishing Wisconsin's worker's compensation program, the first of its kind in the United States.

In 1906, Commons co-founded the American Association for Labor Legislation (AALL) with other economists. 

Commons was a contributor to The Pittsburgh Survey, a 1907 sociological investigation of a single American city. His graduate student, John A. Fitch, wrote  The Steel Workers, a classic depiction of a key industry in early 20th-century America. It was one of six key texts to come out of the survey.  Edwin E. Witte, later known as the "father of social security" also did his PhD at the University of Wisconsin–Madison under Commons.

He was a leading advocate of proportional representation in the United States, writing a book on the subject in 1907 and serving as vice-president of the Proportional Representation League.

Commons undertook two major studies of the history of labor unions in the United States. Beginning in 1910, he edited A Documentary History of American Industrial Society, a large work that preserved many original-source documents of the American labor movement. Almost as soon as that work was complete, Commons began editing History of Labor in the United States, a narrative work which built on the previous 10-volume documentary history.

In 1934, Commons published Institutional Economics, which laid out his view that institutions were made up of collective actions that, along with conflict of interests, defined the economy. He believed that institutional economics added collective control of individual transactions to existing economic theory. Commons considered the Scottish economist Henry Dunning Macleod to be the "originator" of Institutional economics.

Death and legacy

He died on May 11, 1945.

Today, Commons's contribution to labor history is considered equal to his contributions to the theory of institutional economics. He also made valuable contributions to the history of economic thought, especially with regard to collective action. He is honored at the University of Wisconsin in Madison with rooms and clubs named for him.

Commons was the mentor of many outstanding economists and has been credited with originating the "Wisconsin Idea," in which university faculty serve as advisors to state government.

His former home, The John R. and Nell Commons House, is listed on the National Register of Historic Places.

Quotes
 "An institution is defined as collective action in control, liberation and expansion of individual action." —"Institutional Economics" American Economic Review, vol. 21 (December 1931), pp. 648–657.
 "...But the smallest unit of the institutional economists is a unit of activity — a transaction, with its participants. Transactions intervene between the labor of the classic economists and the pleasures of the hedonic economists, simply because it is society that controls access to the forces of nature, and transactions are, not the "exchange of commodities," but the alienation and acquisition, between individuals, of the rights of property and liberty created by society, which must therefore be negotiated between the parties concerned before labor can produce, or consumers can consume, or commodities be physically exchanged..." —"Institutional Economics" American Economic Review, vol. 21 (December 1931), pp. 648–657.

Publications

Solely authored works
 The Distribution of Wealth. New York: Macmillan, 1893.
 Social Reform and the Church. New York: Thomas Y. Crowell, 1894.
 Proportional Representation. New York: Crowell, 1896. Second Edition: Macmillan, 1907.
 City Government. Albany, NY: University of the State of New York Extension Dept., 1898.
 Races and Immigrants in America. New York: Macmillan, 1907.
 Horace Greeley and the Working Class Origins of the Republican Party. Boston: Ginn and Co., 1909.
 Labor and Administration. New York: Macmillan, 1913.
 Industrial Goodwill. New York: McGraw-Hill Book Co., 1919.
 Trade Unionism and Labor Problems. Boston: Ginn and Co., 1921.
 Legal Foundations of Capitalism. New York: Macmillan, 1924.
 Reasonable Value: A Theory of Volitional Economics Edwards Brothers, 1925
 Institutional Economics. New York: Macmillan, 1934.
 Myself. Madison: University of Wisconsin Press, 1934.

Co-authored works
 Commons, John R. and Andrews, J. B. Principles of Labor Legislation. New York: Harper and Bros., 4th edn 1916. (archive.org; Online 
 Commons, John R., et al. History of Labor in the United States. Vols. 1–4. New York: Macmillan, 1918–1935.
 Commons, John R., et al. Industrial Government. New York: Macmillan, 1921.
 Commons, John R.; Parsons, Kenneth H.; and Perlman, Selig. The Economics of Collective Action. New York: Macmillan, 1950.

Edited works
 Commons, John R. (Ed.). Trade Unionism and Labor Problems. Boston: Ginn and Co., 1905.
 Commons, John R. (Ed.). A Documentary History of American Industrial Society. In 10 Volumes. Cleveland, Ohio: Arthur H. Clark Co., 1910.

See also
 EAEPE
 US labor law
 UK labour law

Notes

References
 Barbash, Jack. "John R. Commons: Pioneer of Labor Economics," Monthly Labor Review 112:5 (May 1989) 
Chasse, John, Dennis."A Worker's Economist: John R. Commons and His Legacy from Progressivism to the War on Poverty.New York: Transactions Press,2017
 Coats, A.W. "John R. Commons as a Historian of Economics: The Quest for the Antecedents of Collective Action" in Research in the History of Economic Thought and Methodology, Vol.1, 1983.
Commons, John, R. 1900. Representative Democracy. New York: American Bureau of Economic Research, 1900.  Available at https://babel.hathitrust.org/cgi/pt?id=coo.31924032462842&view=1up&seq=18
 Commons, John R. Myself. Reprint ed. Madison: University of Wisconsin Press, 1964.
 Dorfman, Joseph. The Economic Mind in American Civilization: 1918–1933. Vols. 4 and 5. Reissue ed. New York: Augustus M. Kelley Publications, 1969. 
 Fitch, John A. The Steel Workers. Reprint ed. Pittsburgh: University of Pittsburgh Press, 1910 (1989). .
 Parson, Kenneth. "John R. Commons Point of View," Journal of Land and Public Utility Economics (Land Economics) 18(3):245–60 (1942).
 Samuels, Warren. "Reader's Guide to John R. Commons Legal Foundations of Capitalism," in Warren Samuels, ed. Research in the History of Economic Thought and Methodology, Archival Supplement 5, Amsterdam: Elsevier 1996.
 Tichi, Cecelia. "John R. Commons: The Pittsburgh Survey," in "Civic Passions: Seven Who Launched Progressive America (And What They Teach Us)." Chapel Hill: University of North Carolina Press, 2009. 
 Kemp, Thomas. Progress and Reform, Saarbrücken, Germany: VDM Verlag, 2009.
 Fiorito Luca, and Massimiliano Vatiero (2011), "Beyond Legal Relations: Wesley Newcomb Hohfeld's Influence on American Institutionalism". Journal of Economics Issues, 45 (1): 199–222.

External links

 
 
 "John R. Commons, 1862–1945," History of Economic Thought, The New School
 Thayer Watkins, "John R. Commons and His Economic Philosophy," San Jose State University. 
 
 
 

1862 births
1945 deaths
Georgist economists
Institutional economists
Historians of economic thought
Labor historians
University of Wisconsin–Madison faculty
Syracuse University faculty
Wisconsin Prohibitionists
19th-century American economists
20th-century American economists
Progressive Era in the United States
Presidents of the American Economic Association